Heidi Blickenstaff (born December 28, 1971) is an American actress based in New York City best known for playing a version of herself in the musical [title of show] during its Off-Broadway and Broadway runs, as well as for originating the role of Bea in the 2015 musical Something Rotten!. She co-starred with Cozi Zuehlsdorff in the Disney Channel musical version of Freaky Friday which was broadcast on August 10, 2018.

Personal life
Blickenstaff grew up in Fresno, California, and got her start in musical theater at Good Company Players, where her roles included "Annie" in the musical of the same name. She is a graduate of Roosevelt High School in Fresno, Calif., and Duke University's Department of Theater Studies.

Her father, Dale Blickenstaff, is the former District Attorney of Fresno County. In 2015, Blickenstaff married Nicholas Rohlfing.

Career 

Blickenstaff is a Broadway performer who gained widespread notice for her work in [title of show] after some years of working in understudy, supporting, and ensemble roles. The musical documents its own creation by Broadway fans Jeff Bowen and Hunter Bell, who want to enter the New York Musical Theatre Festival and struggle to complete the show in three and a half weeks with their two actress friends. The actors are also the writers and characters of the musical. Blickenstaff has said her character in [title of show], a struggling actor also named "Heidi", is a "concentrated version" of her actual personality.<ref name="playbill">{{Cite web|last=Gans|first=Andrew|date=11 July 2008|title=DIVA TALK: Chatting with [title of show]'''s Heidi Blickenstaff Plus Heights and Pacific on CD|url=https://www.playbill.com/article/diva-talk-chatting-with-title-of-show-s-heidi-blickenstaff-plus-heights-and-pacific-on-cd-com-151584|url-status=live|archive-url=|archive-date=|access-date=12 January 2021|website=Playbill}}</ref>

She also has credited her experience in [title of show] with easing her chronic stage fright, a form of self-doubt immortalized in one of the show's songs, "Die Vampire Die". "I also have a stage fright vampire", she told TheaterMania in 2006, during [title of show]'s extended off-Broadway run at the Vineyard Theatre. "Certainly, [title of show] has been great medicine, because we talk about that stuff."

Other work
Blickenstaff's other Broadway credits include The Full Monty on Broadway (as Susan Hershey) and The Little Mermaid (as Carlotta/Ensemble and u/s for Ursula).

In 2006, she starred in the musical Meet John Doe at the Ford's Theatre in Washington, D.C., winning a Helen Hayes Award for her performance.

Of Blickenstaff's performance in the musical—an adaptation of the 1941 Frank Capra film of the same name—Peter Marks wrote in the Washington Post: "She's a dynamite successor to the movie's Barbara Stanwyck: It's a star performance, in fact. There's an effortless kind of kick to Blickenstaff's readings of Ann's sharp-elbowed lines. And she can sing, to boot."

Blickenstaff's other regional credits include roles in The Girl in the Frame at the Goodspeed Opera House, Bat Boy at Theatreworks in Palo Alto, California, and Prairie at New York Stage and Film.

She has also performed in touring productions of The Full Monty, Jekyll & Hyde (as the understudy for the role of Lucy Harris), Steel Pier, Dreamgirls, and The Who's Tommy. It was during the Tommy tour that Blickenstaff met her future [title of show] co-star (and the musical's co-creator/composer) Jeff Bowen.

She has appeared in a television commercials for Nationwide Insurance and Foster Grant.

Blickenstaff replaced Sherie Rene Scott as Ursula in the Broadway production of The Little Mermaid on January 27, 2009, and stayed with the show until April 5, 2009. She was succeeded by Faith Prince.

She replaced Carolee Carmello as Alice Beineke in The Addams Family on March 8, 2011.

Blickenstaff was a member of the original cast of the review First You Dream: The Music of Kander and Ebb, which premiered at the Signature Theatre in Arlington, Virginia, in 2009, and the revival that played at the Kennedy Center in Washington, D.C., in June 2012.

In July 2013, Blickenstaff played Diana in Next to Normal at the Weston Playhouse in Weston, Vermont.

In April 2014, she played Cleo in the City Center Encores! staging of The Most Happy Fella with Laura Benanti and Cheyenne Jackson.

Blickenstaff played Jane/Bonnie in the world premiere of Dog and Pony at The Old Globe Theatre from May through July 2014 with Nicole Parker, Beth Leavel, Jon Patrick Walker, and Eric William Morris. Dog and Pony has a book by Rick Elice and music and lyrics by Michael Patrick Walker, and was directed by Roger Rees.

From November 2014 to January 2015, Blickenstaff played Emily Hobbs in Paper Mill Playhouse's production of Elf: The Musical.

Blickenstaff returned to Broadway in March 2015, originating the role of Bea in Something Rotten!, alongside Christian Borle and Brian d'Arcy James.

In the fall of 2017, Blickenstaff filmed the new Disney Channel musical version of Freaky Friday as the mother whose personality "swaps" with her daughter, played by Cozi Zuehlsdorff. The film was broadcast on Disney Channel in August 2018. 

Blickenstaff can be heard on the cast recordings of [title of show], Now. Here. This., Meet John Doe, The Little Mermaid, and Something Rotten!''. She also sang on the recordings "Sweet Bye and Bye," featuring the music of Vernon Duke; "Jerome Kern: The Land Where the Good Songs Go"; Michael Kooman and Christopher Dimond's "Out of Our Heads"; "Keys: The Music of Scott Alan"; and Georgia Stitt's "My Lifelong Love."

Theatre

Filmography

Film

Television

Discography

Awards and nominations

References

External links

American stage actresses
Living people
1971 births
Actresses from Fresno, California
Duke University alumni
20th-century American actresses
21st-century American actresses
American musical theatre actresses